Hypsotropa limbella is a species of snout moth in the genus Hypsotropa. It was described by Zeller in 1848. It is found in France, Italy, Croatia, Bosnia and Herzegovina, Albania, Greece, North Macedonia, Bulgaria, Romania and Asia Minor.

The wingspan is about 17 mm.

References

Moths described in 1848
Anerastiini
Moths of Europe
Moths of Asia